IPRI may refer to:

 International Property Rights Index
 Islamabad Policy Research Institute, a Pakistan-based strategic think tank